Cloşca may refer to several places in Romania:

Cloşca, a village in Horia Commune, Constanţa County
Cloşca, a village in Horia Commune, Tulcea County
Cloșca, Satu Mare, a residential district in Satu Mare County
Hilişeu-Cloşca, a village in Hilișeu-Horia Commune, Botoșani County